{{DISPLAYTITLE:Rhaetian Railway Ge 6/6 II}}

The Rhaetian Railway Ge 6/6 II is a class of heavy metre gauge electric locomotives operated by the Rhaetian Railway (RhB), which is the main railway network in the Canton of Graubünden, Switzerland.

The class is so named because it was the second class of locomotives of the Swiss locomotive and railcar classification type Ge 6/6 to be acquired by the Rhaetian Railway. According to that type designation, Ge 6/6 denotes a narrow gauge electric adhesion locomotive with a total of six axles, all of which are drive axles.

The twelve-wheel Ge 6/6 II machines (UIC classification Bo′Bo′Bo′) are currently used mainly to haul goods trains.

History

Background 
In the 1950s, traffic on the Rhaetian Railway grew so strongly that the existing Ge 6/6 Crocodiles and the Ge 4/4 I Bo-Bo locomotives were no longer sufficient.

Commissioning 
The two locomotives of the first production run (numbers 701 and 702) were delivered by the manufacturers Schweizerische Lokomotiv- und Maschinenfabrik (SLM), Brown, Boveri & Cie (BBC) and Maschinenfabrik Oerlikon (MFO) at a price of 230,000 Swiss francs each.  The remaining locomotives in the class (numbers 703 to 707, each placed in service in 1965) were each 200,000 francs more expensive.

Construction

As delivered 
Technically, the electrical components of the Ge 6/6 II class corresponded with the then state of the art: (low voltage) on-load tap-changer transformer, and single phase universal traction motors.

The two outermost bogies and the traction motors were exchangeable with the Ge 4/4 I.  The box joint between the two halves of the locomotive permits only vertical movements.

Modifications 
The first two locomotives were fitted with communication doors on the cab fronts.  These were welded up in 1968–69, but the complete assimilation of the first two locos with the second series (which have two instead of three cab end windows) occurred only towards the end of the 1980s.  In 1985 the Rhaetian Railway began reliverying the class from green to red, and in 1998 the original diamond shaped pantographs were replaced with modern single arm pantographs.

The Ge 6/6 II today 
After completion of the Bergell power station, the 700s were used predominantly to haul fast passenger trains on the Albula Railway.  Since these duties were taken over by the Ge 4/4 III class, which was placed in service in 1993, the Ge 6/6 II has been found mainly at the head of goods trains on the whole of the Rhaetian Railway's core network (apart from the Arosa line).  However, the 700s can still be seen hauling some passenger trains.

Loco 701 carries the name of the Roman province of Raetia, which to this day has remained as a synonym for the Swiss province of Graubünden.  Loco 702 bears the name Curia, which is the Latin name of the canton's capital city, Chur.  The remaining locos, numbered 703–707, are named after major Graubünden municipalities, each situated at an end point of the core network.  Adjacent to the name on every locomotive is the traffic number in white, along with the coat of arms of the applicable municipality (on loco 701, the Graubünden coat of arms).

As for the future of the Ge 6/6 II class one locomotive is to be retained by Rhb Historic for preservation Loco 704 Davos for forseable future. 
In July 2020, locomotive 701 was the first locomotive of this series to be taken out of service, followed by locomotive 705 at the beginning of January 2021. On February 10, 2021, locomotive 701 was the first locomotive in Chur to be scrapped. In mid-May 2021, locomotive 705 was put into service again because locomotive 704 suffered major damage. Locomotive 706 was putting out of service after an engine failure, locomotive 703 after a minor fire and engine failure. On November 1, 2021, all other locomotives (702, 705, 707) were discarded and parked. Locomotive 704 was to be retained as an operational museum vehicle. Due to the poor condition of locomotive 704, the RhB ultimately decided to keep locomotive 707. It was transferred to Samedan on November 19, 2021 and is parked there in the depot without an operating license until further notice.

List of locomotives 

The following locomotives in the class are in service on the Rhaetian Railway:

See also

 History of rail transport in Switzerland
 Rail transport in Switzerland

References 

 This article is based upon a translation of the German language version as of January 2010.

External links

SLM locomotives
Brown, Boveri & Cie locomotives
Bo′Bo′Bo′ locomotives
Electric locomotives of Switzerland
11 kV AC locomotives
Rhaetian Railway locomotives
Railway locomotives introduced in 1958
Metre gauge electric locomotives